This is a compilation of the results of teams representing Russia at the official international competitions for European women's football clubs, that is, the former UEFA Women's Cup and its successor the UEFA Women's Champions League. Russia is one of two associations that have reached the final of the competition but haven't won it, the other being Denmark.

As of the 2019-20 edition Russia is ranked 10th in the UWCL association rankings with a coefficient of 31,500. Therefore, both the champion and the runner-up of the Russian Championship qualify for the competition.

Teams
These are the nine teams that have represented Russia in the UEFA Women's Cup and the UEFA Women's Champions League.

Qualification

Historical progression

Results by team

Chertanovo

CSK VVS Samara

CSKA Moscow

Energiya Voronezh

Lada Togliatti

Rossiyanka

Ryazan-VDV

Zorky Krasnogorsk

Zvezda-2005 Perm

References

Women's football clubs in international competitions
 Women